Biret may refer to:

People 
  (born 1966), a Turkish textile artist
  (born 1941), a Turkish concert pianist

Places

Syria 
 Biret Armanaz, a village in Harem District, Idlib Governorate
 Biret Eljabal, a village in al-Suqaylabiyah District, Hama Governorate
 Birat al-Jurd or Birat al-Jard, a village in Masyaf District, Hama Governorate

See also 
 Biret International SA v Council of the European Union, a 2003 legal appeal at the European Court of Justice regarding import restrictions on meat products
 Biretta, a square cap with three or four peaks or horns worn by some clergy and some law advocates
 Beretta, an Italian firearms manufacturer